TOI-640 b is an exoplanet that was suspected since 2019, discovery been confirmed by TESS team in January 2021. It is located 1115 light years away from Earth, orbiting primary F-class star in the binary star system with red dwarf and has an orbital period of 5 days.

The planet orbits its host star nearly over poles, misalignment between orbital plane and equatorial plane of the star been equal to 104°

References 

Exoplanets discovered in 2021
Exoplanets discovered by TESS